Mauro Vigorito (born 22 May 1990) is an Italian professional football player. He plays for  club Como on loan from Cosenza.

Club career
He made his Serie A debut for Cagliari Calcio on 31 January 2010 when he came on as a substitute for the injured Federico Marchetti in the 21st minute against Fiorentina.

On 18 July 2013 Vigorito was signed by Venezia in a co-ownership deal from Cagliari.

Vicenza
On 28 August 2014 Davide D'Appolonia and Vigorito were signed by Vicenza from Venezia.

On 8 June 2015 Vigorito signed a new two-year contract.

Como
On 1 September 2022, Vigorito moved to Como on a season-long loan.

References

External links
 
 

1990 births
People from the Province of Nuoro
Footballers from Sardinia
Living people
Italian footballers
Association football goalkeepers
Serie A players
Serie B players
Serie C players
Cagliari Calcio players
Carrarese Calcio players
U.S. Triestina Calcio 1918 players
F.C. Lumezzane V.G.Z. A.S.D. players
Venezia F.C. players
L.R. Vicenza players
Frosinone Calcio players
U.S. Lecce players
Cosenza Calcio players
Como 1907 players